State Highway 184 (SH 184) is a Texas state highway running  from Bronson east to Hemphill. This route was designated on November 30, 1932, along its current route. This highway was SH 87A before March 19, 1930, and this highway was erroneously omitted from the March 19, 1930 highway log.

Major Junctions

References

184
Transportation in Sabine County, Texas